The 2006 NBA Development League expansion draft was the first expansion draft of the National Basketball Association Development League (NBADL). The draft was held on September 19, 2006, so that the newly founded Colorado 14ers, Bakersfield Jam, Anaheim Arsenal and Los Angeles D-Fenders could acquire players for the upcoming 2006–07 season. An independent agency conducted a random drawing to determine the selection order. Colorado was awarded the first overall pick, followed by Bakersfield, Anaheim and Los Angeles. The expansion draft was conducted via conference call from the NBA Development League's main office, and it drew from a pool comprising 44 players who had played in the D-League the season before but who were not currently on D-League rosters. Regarding the inaugural expansion draft, Senior Director of Basketball Operations and Player Personnel Chris Alpert said, "The Expansion Draft is an effort to give new teams an equal footing in regard to rights to returning players. The league will sign up to four players from season-ending rosters of returning teams, so this levels the playing field somewhat heading into the regular Draft."

Elton Brown, a forward from Virginia, was the number one overall selection. He is among six players taken in the expansion draft who became NBA Development League All-Stars. The five others include Andre Barrett, Jawad Williams, Rick Rickert, Brian Chase and Kaniel Dickens. Four players had also been selected in an NBA Draft: Tremaine Fowlkes (1998), Mateen Cleaves (2000), Dickens (2000) and Rickert (2003). In the 40 selections, two of the players were non-American. Hiram Fuller is Libyan, while Sung-Yoon Bang is South Korean.

Key

Draft

All information summarised in this table comes from the NBA draft announcement or from a summary of those results.

References
General

Specific

draft
NBA G League expansion draft